MTV Webbed is an Indian teen drama created by Vikas Gupta produced by Ekta Kapoor and Shobha Kapoor under their banner Balaji Telefilms. The series premiered on MTV India.

Plot
The series revolves around real-life testimonies of those who have been victimized in the malicious web of identity theft, pornography and other crimes of cyber abuse.

Season Overview

Episodes

Cast

References

External links
Official webpage on MTV INDIA
 MTV Webbed on Voot
 

Balaji Telefilms television series
MTV (Indian TV channel) original programming
2013 Indian television series debuts
Indian teen drama television series
2014 Indian television series endings
Indian anthology television series